was a Japanese photographer who was a member of Vivo.

References

Japanese photographers
1925 births
2015 deaths